Silvestrus ceylonicus is a species of millipede in the family Polyxenidae. It is endemic to Sri Lanka.

References

Polyxenida
Animals described in 1892
Millipedes of Asia
Endemic fauna of Sri Lanka
Arthropods of Sri Lanka